"Alive and Living Now" is a song by The Golden Palominos. Although they had released other singles in promotion of their albums, "Alive and Living Now" is their only charting song. Guest musicians include Michael Stipe of R.E.M. on vocals, British songwriter Richard Thompson on lead guitar, and jazz bandleader Carla Bley on Hammond organ.

Reception 
The song charted at #14 on U.S. Billboard Modern Rock Tracks and was subject to some critical acclaim. allmusic critic Tom Demalon described the track as "a buoyant, midtempo celebration of life" and a highlight of the album. David Browne of Entertainment Weekly went as far as to declare the track more vibrant than the entirety of the Out of Time album released the same year. Browne stated, "the song, Stipe's ode to that special someone who re-energizes you after all seems lost, virtually explodes with a kicky blast of newfound love, and it's a thrill to hear Stipe, who enunciates every confessional word, go out on such an emotional limb."

Chart positions

Personnel 
Carla Bley – Hammond organ
Anton Fier – drums, percussion, production
Amanda Kramer – keyboards, backing vocals
Bill Laswell – bass guitar
Nicky Skopelitis – guitar, acoustic guitar
Michael Stipe – vocals
Richard Thompson – guitar

References 

1991 songs
1991 singles
Songs written by Michael Stipe